Ext3cow or third extended filesystem with copy-on-write is an open source, versioning file system based on the ext3 file system.  Versioning is implemented through block-level copy-on-write.  It shares many of its performance characteristics with ext3.

Ext3cow provides a time-shifting interface that permits a real-time and continuous view of data in the past.  Time-shifting is a novel interface, introduced in ext3cow, allowing users to navigate through and access past namespaces by adding a time component to their commands.

Ext3cow was designed to be a platform for compliance with the versioning and auditability requirements 
of recent US electronic record retention legislation, such as Sarbanes-Oxley and HIPAA.

A version of ext3cow for the Linux 2.6 kernel was released on March 30, 2007.

Details on ext3cow's implementation can be found in a 2005 paper.

See also 
 ext3
 Next3
 List of file systems
 Comparison of file systems
 Htree

References

External links 
 
 

Disk file systems
File systems supported by the Linux kernel